Torsuut Tunoq (old spelling: Torssuut Tunoq) is a sound on the southeastern coast of Greenland. It is an inner waterway of the North Atlantic.

Geography 
The sound separates Kulusuk Island in the south from Apusiaajik Island in the northeast, and from the small Akinaaq island and smaller skerries in the northwest. The strait waterway connects Ammassalik Fjord in the northwest with the North Atlantic in the southeast, through the Ikaasaartik Strait. 

During winter pack ice and small icebergs pushed forth by the East Greenland Current ram against the northeastern coast, blocking the narrow Ikaasaartik Strait and facilitating the freeze of the much wider Torsuut Tunoq sound. The tidewater Apusiaajik Glacier drains into the sound in its northernmost part.

Settlement 
Kulusuk is the only settlement in the area, located on an island of the same name on the southern coast of the sound.

Transport 

The inhabitants of Kulusuk use snowmobiles and traditional dogsleds as additional means of transport during wintertime−families arriving at the Kulusuk Airport are ferried to the settlement on both, using the frozen waterway.

In the summer, the cargo boats of Royal Arctic Line connect Kulusuk and Tasiilaq, providing an ad hoc alternative for the helicopter flights of Air Greenland. Polar cruises bound for, or returning from the coastal voyages in the Kangertittivaq fjord and the shores of Northeast Greenland National Park often visit the area on their way from/to Tasiilaq, albeit without anchoring in the harbour due to the shallowness of the coastal waters in the sound.

References 

Sounds of North America
Straits of Greenland